In United States politics, a ranking member is the most senior member of a congressional or state legislative committee from the minority party.  On many committees the ranking minority member, along with the Chair, serve as ex officio members of all of the committee's subcommittees.

Both the United States Senate and United States House of Representatives use ranking members as part of their legislative structure.

When party control of a legislative chamber changes, a committee's ranking minority member is ensured to become the next chairman of the committee, and vice versa.

Congressional usage
Four Senate committees refer to the ranking minority member as vice chairman. The following committees follow the chairman/vice chairman structure for the majority and minority parties.

Senate Committee on Appropriations
Senate Committee on Indian Affairs
Senate Select Committee on Ethics
Senate Select Committee on Intelligence

Other Senate committees refer to the ranking minority members as ranking member.

The House of Representatives normally does not use the term vice chairman for the ranking minority member, though some committees do have a vice-chairman position, usually assigned to a senior member of the majority party other than the chairman. House committees that follow this structure are:

House Committee on Agriculture
House Committee on Appropriations
House Committee on the Budget
House Committee on Education and the Workforce
House Committee on Energy and Commerce
House Committee on Financial Services
House Committee on Government Reform
House Committee on Foreign Affairs
House Committee on Resources
House Committee on Veterans' Affairs
House Permanent Select Committee on Intelligence (subcommittees only)

The position of vice chair as the designation for the ranking minority member has been used for the House January 6 Committee.

Joint committees of the House and Senate operate in much the same way, with a chairman and vice-chairman from the majority party, alternating between a member of the House and a member of the Senate, and often two ranking members from both bodies.

References

Committees of the United States Congress
Leaders of the United States Congress